Glory is the third studio album by the Christian rapper Manafest.  It was released on September 26, 2006 under BEC Recordings.

The release contains the single "Impossible", featuring Trevor McNevan of Thousand Foot Krutch.

Critical reception
The album received very positive reviews from most professional music sites and reviews.

Justin Mabee of Jesus Freak Hideout praised the album saying: "Sophomore records seem to always be hard to make, even if a debut doesn't do as well as some artists would like. It seems that Manafest got some pointers and used them to his advantage, and with Glory, it blows his debut out of the water. This is definitely an album to check out, and keep an eye out for Manafest as his sound continues to mature."  David Bain of Cross Rhythms commented: "BEC Recordings new signing Canadian Chris Greenwood, aka Manafest, has already been making quite a name for himself with his vibrant blend of hard rock and hip-hop rhythms.  Not dissimilar to mainstream groups Linkin Park and the Beastie Boys, Manafest delivers a tight debut which at moments leaves one lost for breathe at the sheer energy on display." Lindsay Whitfield of Soulshine went on to say: "Manafest is able to empathize and offer positive solutions as to how he got out of his mess. How many rappers do you know who do that? Not many. Glory is a great album for those with a love for wordplay and listening to the best name in rap this side of the border."

Awards
The album was nominated for "Rap/Hip Hop Album of the Year" at the 38th annual GMA Dove Awards.

The album was also nominated for "Rap/Hip Hop Album of the Year" at the 29th annual GMA Canada Covenant Awards.  The song "Bounce" off the release was awarded "Rap/Hip Hop Song of the Year" the same year.  Manafest himself was also nominated for Artist of the Year for his work with Glory in 2007.

Furthermore, the album also received a nomination in the category of "Contemporary Christian/Gospel Album of the Year" for the Juno Awards of 2007.

Track listing

Personnel 

 Manafest – lead vocals, executive producer
 Justin Humes (formerly of Velvet Empire) – additional vocals (1)
 Trevor McNevan – additional vocals (4), (13—Japan edition)
 Promise – additional vocals (7), backing vocals (12—deluxe edition) 
 Liz Rodriguez – backing vocals (3)
 Surgeonia – backing vocals (6)
 Divine Trinity – backing vocals (7)
 Aubrey "Bre" Noronha – backing vocals (8, 11); (13—deluxe edition)
 Chris Stacey – backing vocals (8)
 The Surgeon – backing vocals (9)
 Daniel Galessiere – backing vocals (11)
 Charles "DJ Versatile" Sabota – cuts, scratching (10)
 Adam Messinger – mixing
 Jeff Carver – A&R
 Melanie Greenwood – art design, photography
 Chris Thompson – photography

Music videos

*Music videos for "Rodeo" and "Runaway" are also included on the Japanese edition of the album.

Lyric videos

Notes
The opening segment of "Don't Turn Away" is originally from the first verse of the song "Let It Go" (off Epiphany).
In 2010, as with many of Manafest's releases, Glory was given an album instrumentals release.
The deluxe edition bonus track remix of "Impossible" was originally released as an iTunes bonus track to Manafest's 2010 album The Chase.
The song "Wanna Know You" was included in the soundtrack of the game Flatout Ultimate Carnage.

References

2006 albums
BEC Recordings albums
Tooth & Nail Records albums
Manafest albums